Pop Goes Art! is the debut album of English band the Times.<ref name="Discogs.com">[http://www.discogs.com/Times-Pop-Goes-Art/release/1434310 The Times on Discogs.com]</ref>
It was recorded in the summer of 1981 and released in 1982. A previous album, Go! with the Times'' was recorded in November 1980, but not issued until 1985.

Track listing
 Side A
 "Picture Gallery"
 "Biff! Bang! Pow!"
 "It's Time!"
 "If Now Is the Answer"
 "A New Arrangement"
 "Looking at the World Through Dark Shades"
 "I Helped Patrick McGoohan Escape"

 Side B
 "Pop Goes Art! (Melody in Mono)"
 "Miss London"
 "The Sun Never Sets"
 "Easy as Pie"
 "This Is Tomorrow...."

Personnel
 John East
 Paul Damien
 Edward Ball
 Daniel Treacy

References

The Times (band) albums
1982 debut albums